Nevel may refer to:

People
Ernie Nevel (1918–1988), American baseball player
Van Nevel, people with that surname

Places
Nevel Urban Settlement, a municipal formation into which the town of Nevel in Nevelsky District of Pskov Oblast, Russia is incorporated
Nevel (town), a town in Nevelsky District of Pskov Oblast, Russia
Lake Nevel, a lake in Nevelsky District of Pskov Oblast, Russia

Other
Nevel (instrument), a stringed instrument used by ancient Hebrew people
Nevel (ship), see Tracking ship#Russian Navy / Soviet Navy
Nevel Papperman, a character in the iCarly American teen sitcom

See also
Nevelsky (disambiguation)
Nevele, a municipality in East Flanders Province of Belgium